Rumaithiya ( Arabic:Ar-Rumaytheeyah Kuwaiti Arabic:Il-Irmeitheeyah  ) is a residential area in Hawalli governorate, Kuwait City, Kuwait. It's geographically divided into twelve blocks.

4Blocks,25street,rumaithiya ,kuwait 

Rumaithiya is officially divided into 12 blocks. Every block has a mosque and Rumaithiya Co-Op branch.

Landmarks

Masjids 

Rumaithiya was designed to make a space for a branch of the Co-op and the supermarket. Due to this, there are 12 government-built masjids in Rumaithiya, with one more government-built masjid near the main Co-op. The biggest masjid, Masjid Maqamis is in Block 11

Husayniyat 

 Rumaithiya has the largest number of husayniyas in Kuwait with more than 70 Husayniya.

Rumaithiya Co-Op Society 

Rumaithiya Co-Op Society is the official and only supermarket in the area.

 12 Branches in every block, except the 7th block
 15,144+ Contributors

Sports area

Public Parks 

 Large public park in block 6 with grass stadiums.
 Normal public park in block 8 with grass stadium, starbucks coffee shop.

Schools 

 13 schools (the largest number in Kuwait) excluding private schools and kindergartens

Religion 

Most of Rumaithia's people are Shia Muslim. Due to this fact, there are a lot of husainiyas in the area.

References 

Suburbs of Kuwait City
Areas of Hawalli Governorate